Henry Eaton Moore was an American composer born in Andover, New Hampshire on July 21, 1803.  He died in Cambridge, Massachusetts on October 23, 1841. Besides music he also was in the publishing business.

References

1803 births
1841 deaths
American male composers
19th-century American composers
People from Andover, New Hampshire
19th-century American male musicians